"The Dirt" is a song by Swedish singer Benjamin Ingrosso. It was released as a single on 17 January 2020 by TEN Music Group. The song peaked at number 14 on the Swedish Singles Chart. The song was written by Benjamin Ingrosso, Didrik Franzén, Hampus Lindvall, Markus Sepehrmanesh and Valentin Brunel.

Music video
A music video to accompany the release of "The Dirt" was first released onto YouTube on 16 January 2020.

Track listing

Personnel
Credits adapted from Tidal.
 Didrik Franzén – producer, writer
 Hampus Lindvall – producer, writer
 Valentin Brunel – producer, writer
 Benjamin Ingrosso – writer
 Markus Sepehrmanesh – writer
 Björn Engelmann – engineer

Charts

Certifications

References

2020 songs
2020 singles
Benjamin Ingrosso songs
English-language Swedish songs
Songs written by Benjamin Ingrosso
Songs written by Marcus Sepehrmanesh
Songs written by Kungs
Songs written by Hampus Lindvall